A partial solar eclipse occurred on November 13–14, 1993. A solar eclipse occurs when the Moon passes between Earth and the Sun, thereby totally or partly obscuring the image of the Sun for a viewer on Earth. A partial solar eclipse occurs in the polar regions of the Earth when the center of the Moon's shadow misses the Earth.
It was visible at sunrise over parts of Australia on November 14th (Sunday), and ended at sunset over the southern tip of South America on November 13th (Saturday).

Images

Related eclipses

Eclipses of 1993 
 A partial solar eclipse (north) on May 21.
 A total lunar eclipse (central, passing north of the axis) on June 4.
 A partial solar eclipse (south) on November 13.
 A total lunar eclipse (south) on November 29.

Solar eclipses 1993–1996

Metonic series

References

External links 
 NASA graphics

1993 11 13
1993 in science
1993 11 13
November 1993 events